(born August 13, 1967) is a Japanese video game music composer, well known for her work in the Wild Arms series.

Composing career
She used to work for Telenet Japan and Riot, but many people who worked for these two companies left, and along with Naruke, later started working for Media.Vision. She has composed music for games outside of the Wild ARMs series, such as Psycho Dream on the Super Famicom and the Tenshi no Uta series on the PC Engine. While it was speculated that Naruke composed under the pseudonym "Hassy" for the @MIDI albums, the composer herself has stated that Hassy is a separate individual (Hiroya Hatsushiba).

She has made a number of songs for Media.Vision's Wild ARMs series. Occasionally, the main theme and ending theme of the Wild ARMs songs will contain lyrics, formerly being sung by Machiko Watanabe and Kaori Asoh. Most recently, for the tenth anniversary, a new vocalist has been introduced, Nana Mizuki. Her compositions in the Wild ARMs series include her signature whistling parts, whistled by Naoki Takao. Naruke has composed more than 400 songs for the Wild ARMs series. However, during the development of Wild ARMs: The 4th Detonator, Naruke fell ill, marking the first time in the Wild ARMs series that she did not compose the entire soundtrack.

In an interview for Wild ARMs: Piece of Tears, Naruke revealed items which she values, including her keyboard and rhythm machine, a pamphlet of Jerry Goldsmith, a figure of Kurokishi from "Gingaman", an original score of Bach, and a memorial vinyl disc.

Works

Video games
Legion (1990) - composition with Hiroto Otsubo, Shinobu Ogawa, and Takaharu Umezu
Dekoboko Densetsu: Hashiru Wagamanma (1990) - arrangement with Hiroto Otsubo, Minoru Yuasa, and Shingo Murakami
Valis III (Mega Drive) (1991) - arrangement with Takaharu Umezu and Minoru Yuasa
High Grenadier (1991) - composition with Takaharu Umezu
Tenshi no Uta (1991) - composition with Shinobu Ogawa
Mirai Shounen Conan (1992) - composition
Psycho Dream (1992) - composition
Tenshi no Uta II: Datenshi no Sentaku (1993) - composition
Wild Arms (1996) - composition
Wild Arms 2 (1999) - composition
Wild Arms 3 (2002) - composition
Wild Arms Alter Code: F (2003) - composition
Wild Arms 4 (2005) - composition with Masato Kouda, Nobuyuki Shimizu, and Ryuta Suzuki
Super Smash Bros. Brawl (2008) - arrangements of "Ocarina of Time Medley" and "Bramble Blast"
The Wizard of Oz: Beyond the Yellow Brick Road (2008) - composition of "RIZ-ZOAWD!" and "My Home on the Hills"
Noora to Toki no Koubou: Kiri no Mori no Majo (2011) - composition
Half-Minute Hero: The Second Coming (2011) - composition with many others
Super Smash Bros. for Nintendo 3DS and Wii U (2014) - arrangements with many others
Zombie Tokyo (2015) - composition with Noriyuki Iwadare
Atelier Firis: The Alchemist and the Mysterious Journey (2016) - composition of "Beyond the Tempest"
Super Smash Bros. Ultimate (2018) - with various others (“Bloody Tears/Monster Dance” from Castlevania II: Simon’s Quest, "Mad Monster Mansion" from Banjo-Kazooie and "Let's Go to Seoul!" from Fatal Fury 2)
Wild Arms: Million Memories (2018) - composition with Saki Furuya, Naoki Chiba, and Kyohei Ozawa
Rakugaki Kingdom (2019) - composition with many others
Eiyuden Chronicles: Hundred Heroes (2023) - with Motoi Sakuraba
Armed Fantasia: To the End of the Wilderness - with Noriyatsu Agematsu

Other
FM Sound Module Maniax (2006) - composition with many others
Griotte no Nemuri Hime ~FEL ARY LU EN TINDHARIA~ (2009) - composition with many others
Feedback (2013) - composition
Feedback 2nd (2013) - composition
Feedback 3rd (2013) - composition
Feedback 4th. (2014) - composition
Game Music Prayer II (2014) - composition with many others
THE LEGEND ARTISTS Otakara Hakken! (2014) - composition with many others
Feedback 5th. (2014) - composition
Feedback 6th. (2014) - composition

References

External links
Official website (in Japanese)

1967 births
Japanese composers
Japanese women composers
Japanese women musicians
Living people
Musicians from Chiba Prefecture
Video game composers